Varnamad (also Romanized as Varnemad and Varne‘mat; also known as Varnamad-e Soflá) is a village in Honam Rural District, in the Central District of Selseleh County, Lorestan Province, Iran. At the 2006 census, its population was 124, in 30 families.

References 

Towns and villages in Selseleh County